Odontonema laxum is a species of plant in the family Acanthaceae. It is endemic to Ecuador.  Its natural habitat is subtropical or tropical moist lowland forests. It is threatened by habitat loss.

References

Endemic flora of Ecuador
laxum
Endangered plants
Taxonomy articles created by Polbot